Shanyder Antonio Borgelin (born 19 October 2001) is a professional footballer who plays for Major League Soccer club Inter Miami. Born in the United States, Borgelin represents the Haiti national team.

Career

Bethlehem Steel FC
Borgelin appeared as an amateur player for USL Championship side Bethlehem Steel FC during their 2019 season after joining the Philadelphia Union academy in 2017.

Inter Miami CF II
Borgelin signed for Inter Miami CF II in February 2022.

Inter Miami CF
On February 16, 2023, Borgelin signed a homegrown player contract with the Inter Miami CF MLS squad. On February 25 he made his debut with the club as a substitute and scored his first MLS goal in a 2-0 victory against CF Montréal.

International career
Borgelin debuted with the Haiti national team in a friendly 5–1 loss to Bahrain on 1 September 2021.

References

External links 
 

2001 births
Living people
Sportspeople from Broward County, Florida
Haitian footballers
Haiti international footballers
Haiti youth international footballers
American soccer players
American sportspeople of Haitian descent
Citizens of Haiti through descent
Association football forwards
Soccer players from Florida
Philadelphia Union II players
USL Championship players
African-American soccer players
21st-century African-American sportspeople
People from Margate, Florida
MLS Next Pro players
Inter Miami CF II players
Inter Miami CF players
Homegrown Players (MLS)